A Coney Island hot dog, Coney dog, or Coney is a hot dog in a bun topped with a savory meat sauce and sometimes other toppings. It is often offered as part of a menu of classic American "diner" dishes and often at Coney Island restaurants. It is largely a phenomenon related to immigration from Greece and the region of Macedonia to the United States in the early 20th century.

Origin
"Virtually all" Coney Island variations were developed, apparently independently, by Greek or Macedonian immigrants in the early 1900s, many fleeing the Balkan Wars, who entered the US through Ellis Island in New York City.  Family stories of the development of the dishes often included anecdotes about visits to Coney Island.  The origin of the style is somewhat murky: there were parallel developments in New York, Michigan, Ohio, and elsewhere around the United States.

The first documented European name for the island is the Dutch name Conyne Eylandt or Conynge Eylandt. This would roughly be equivalent to Konijn Eiland using modern Dutch spelling, meaning Rabbit Island. The name was anglicized to Coney Island after the English took over the colony in 1664, coney being the corresponding English word.  The hot dog's fame later spread from this part of Brooklyn, New York, where Nathan Handwerker, a Polish Jewish immigrant was an early entrepreneur who sold them at his stand in Coney Island. His business was later named "Nathan's," an iconic brand that remains popular as both a fast-food chain and as a grocery product.  The alternate name for a hot dog—a "Coney," most likely derived from the positive regional and national publicity Nathan's began to generate.

Regional and local varieties

Indiana

Ft. Wayne's Famous Coney Island Wiener Stand was opened in 1914 by three now-unknown immigrants. Vasil Eshcoff, another immigrant, purchased an interest from one of the original owners in 1916. Eschoff's descendants have operated the restaurant since. The Coney Island in Fort Wayne is described as a small, fatty pink hot dog with a "peppery sweet" coney sauce on a soft bun. However, the ground beef-based coney sauce at Ft. Wayne's Famous Coney Island Wiener Stand has the flavor and consistency of a mild peppered savory pork sausage, reflecting its Macedonian heritage. The small hot dog is grilled on a flattop, placed in a steamed bun, yellow mustard applied, then a few teaspoonfuls of the savory chili sauce are added which is then topped with chopped yellow onion.

Michigan
Jane and Michael Stern, writing in 500 Things to Eat Before it's Too Late, note that "there's only one place to start [to pinpoint the top Coney Islands], and that is Detroit.  Nowhere is the passion for them more intense." James Schmidt, in a debate at the 2018 National Fair Food Summit, noted that "Detroit is synonymous with the Coney Dog: you simply cannot have one without the other."

The most influential chili dog stands in Michigan are the American Coney Island and Lafayette Coney Island restaurants located next door to each other in downtown Detroit. The American Coney Island restaurant was founded in 1914 or 1917 by Greek immigrant Constantine "Gust" Keros. Gust brought his brother over from Greece and helped him open the Lafayette Coney Island restaurant next door. There is a fierce rivalry between the two restaurants.

The Coney Island developed in Michigan is a natural-casing beef or beef and pork European-style Wiener Würstchen (Vienna sausage) of German origin, topped with a beef heart-based sauce, one or two stripes of yellow mustard and diced or chopped onions. The variety is a fixture in Flint, Detroit, Jackson, Kalamazoo, and southeastern Michigan. The style originated in the early 20th century, with competing claims from American and Lafayette Coney Islands (1917) in Detroit, and Todoroff's Original Coney Island (1914) in Jackson. The longest continuously operated Coney Island (in the same location) is in Kalamazoo (1915).

Detroit style

In Detroit, historically many Greek and Macedonian immigrants operated Coney islands, or restaurants serving Detroit Coney dogs. By 1975 many Albanians began operating them as well. The Greeks established Onassis Coney Island, which has closed. Greek immigrants established the Coney chains Kerby's Koney Island, Leo's Coney Island, and National Coney Island during the 1960s and early 1970s. All three chains sell some Greek food items with Coney dogs. Detroit style sauce is a bean-less chili sauce, differing from the chili dogs they offer only in the lack of beans. National has most of its restaurants on the east side of the city, and Kerby's and Leo's have the bulk of their restaurants on the west side of the Detroit area.

Flint style

Flint style is characterized by a dry hot dog topping made with a base of ground beef heart, which is ground to a consistency of fine-ground beef.  Some assert that in order to be an "authentic" Flint coney, the hot dog must be a Koegel coney and the sauce by Angelo's, which opened in 1949. However, the sauce was originally developed by a Macedonian in 1924, Simion P. (Sam) Brayan, for his Flint's Original Coney Island restaurant. Brayan was the one who contracted with Koegel Meat Company to make the coney they still make today, also contracting with Abbott's Meat to provide the fine-grind beef heart sauce base. Abbott's still makes Brayan's 1924 sauce base available to restaurants and the public through the Koegel Meat Company and Abbott's Meats. Restaurants then add chopped onions sautéed in beef tallow, along with their own spice mix and other ingredients, to Abbott's sauce base to make their sauce.

Popular folklore perpetuates a legend that a Flint coney sauce recipe containing ground beef and ground hot dogs is the "original" Flint Coney sauce recipe. Variations on this story include either that a relative of the storyteller knew or worked with the former owner of Flint's Original and received the recipe from them, or that the wife of the owner of Flint's Original allowed the publication of the recipe in the Flint Journal after his death. Ron Krueger, longtime food writer of the Flint Journal, included it in a collection of recipes from the newspaper but without a cited source, unlike the rest of the recipes in the collection. When asked about this Mr. Krueger replied, "That recipe appeared in The Journal several times over the years. [I don't] think I ever saw it in the context of a story or ever saw any attribution. It always included the word 'original' in the title, but anybody who knows anything knows otherwise." As to the second story, of Brayan's wife later allowing the publication of the recipe, Velicia Brayan died in 1976, while Simion Brayan lived until the age of 100 and died in 1990. The actual source of this recipe appears to be an earlier Flint Journal Food Editor, Joy Gallagher, who included the recipe in her column of May 23, 1978. In that column she stated she had included the recipe in an even earlier column. Her apparent source was "a woman who said she was the wife of a chef at the original Coney Island, and that she copied the recipe from his personal recipe book." Gallagher stated "I believe her". However, Gallagher also wrote, "I'm not making any claims". In the same column she also included a second recipe that used beef heart, which she wrote "came to me recently from a reader who swears it is the sauce served at Angelo's." The folklore has mixed the supposed sources of the two recipes in this column from Gallagher, with people claiming the ground hot dog recipe is reportedly from Angelo's. In his column published in the Flint Journal on April 18, 1995, Food Editor Ron Krueger reported taking Gallagher's ground hot dog recipe directly to Angelo's co-owner Tom V. Branoff, who refuted the recipe line-by-line. Gallagher's pre-1978 column is still being researched.

Jackson style
Jackson style uses a topping of either ground beef or ground beef heart, onions and spices.  This meat sauce is applied on a quality hot dog in a steamed bun and then topped with diced or chopped onions and a stripe of mustard. The Todoroffs' restaurants were some of the earlier locations for Jackson coneys beginning in 1914. However, those locations are now closed. The company currently manufactures and distribute their coney sauce for retail purchase at supermarkets or other restaurants. There are several other coney restaurants in the area, most notably Jackson Coney Island, Junk Yard Dog, and Virginia Coney Island, all of which are located on East Michigan Avenue in front of the train station near where the original Todoroff's restaurant was located. These restaurants all use a blend of onion and spices similar to Todoroff's but use ground beef heart instead of ground beef for the coney sauce. The Jackson style was late to the usage of beef heart in the sauce, using ground beef prior to converting to ground beef heart in the early 1940s. Each year Jackson Magazine or the Jackson Citizen Patriot have a best coney contest voted on by residents for all the restaurants in the area.

Kalamazoo style
Coney Island Kalamazoo was founded in 1915, and is the longest continuously operated Coney Island in the state. Their coney island is made up of a topping made from their own recipe served on a Koegel's Skinless Frankfurter. Koegel's was not founded until 1916, and it's unknown which hot dog Coney Island Kalamazoo used prior to the Skinless Frankfurter's development.

Suppliers
The following meatpackers provide Coney dogs and European-style Vienna sausage (Frankfurter Würstel) to restaurants and consumers in Michigan:
 Dearborn Sausage Co., primary supplier in Detroit
 Koegel Meat Company, Flint area primary supplier

Many Coney Island restaurants make their own sauces from scratch. However, the different styles of sauces are also available from the following meatpackers:
 Abbott's Meat: Flint style made with ground beef heart
 National Chili Co., primary  metro Detroit supplier
 Detroit Chili Company (owned by American Coney Island): Detroit style

Minnesota

Greek immigrant Gus Saites opened his Original Coney Island in Duluth in 1921. The hot dog used is the Vienna Beef from Chicago, which is topped with the restaurant's own coney sauce, with options of mustard, onion, and for a small fee, cheese. The Superior Street location also offers sport peppers as a topping. The decor includes a copy of their 1959 menu showing that coney islands were 25 cents each.

The Original Coney Island Restaurant and Bar, operated by the Arvanitis Family since 1923 in a former Civil War armory, is the oldest remaining business in St. Paul, though now open only on special occasions.

Ohio

In Cincinnati, a "coney" is a hot dog topped with Cincinnati chili, usually with mustard and chopped onions.  A "cheese coney" adds a final topping of shredded cheddar cheese.  The dish was developed by immigrants Tom and John Kardjieff, founders of Empress Chili, in 1922.  The coney topping is also used as a topping for spaghetti, a dish called a "two-way" or chili spaghetti.   there were over 250 "chili parlors" in Cincinnati serving coneys.  The two largest chains today are Skyline Chili and Gold Star Chili.

Tony Packo's is famous and in Toledo, Ohio.

Oklahoma
Coneys are on restaurant menus throughout Tulsa and were originally created there by Greek immigrants.  Jane and Michael Stern write that "Oklahoma is especially rich in classic coneys" and call out the Coney I-Lander, writing they "perfectly deliver the cheap-eats ecstasy that is the Coney's soul." Oklahoma coneys are small hot dogs on steamed buns with a spicy-sweet dark brown chili sauce, onions, and optional cheese and hot sauce.

Texas
James Coney Island operates a number of locations in the area of Houston, Texas. The company was founded in 1923 by two Greek immigrant brothers, James and Tom Papadakis, the former being the company's namesake.

See also
Coney Island, a type of diner
Chili dog, a very similar dish
Michigan hot dog, a similar dish
 New York System wiener, a similar dish sharing Greek-immigrant roots

Lists
 Cuisine of the Midwestern United States
 List of hot dogs
 List of regional dishes of the United States

Explanatory notes

References

Citations

General and cited sources 
 Yung, Katherine and Joe Grimm (2012). Coney Detroit. Wayne State University Press. .

Further reading
 
 Christoff, Chris (April 1, 2014). "Detroit’s Coney Island Hot Dogs Are Edible Solace for City". Bloomberg.

 .
 .
 
 
 Yung, Katherine and Joe Grimm (2012). Coney Detroit. Detroit, Michigan: Wayne State University Press. .

Cuisine of Michigan
Cuisine of the Midwestern United States
Culture of Detroit
Food and drink in Michigan
Greek-American culture
Hot dogs
Macedonian American history